Kartli Stadium is a multi-use stadium in Gori, Georgia.  It is used mostly for football matches and is the home stadium of FC Gori and Spartaki Tskhinvali. The stadium is able to hold 1,500 people.

See also 
Stadiums in Georgia

Sports venues in Georgia (country)
Football venues in Georgia (country)
Gori, Georgia
Buildings and structures in Shida Kartli